Victor Falck (born 25 October 1997) is a Swedish footballer who plays as a midfielder.

Career

College
Falck began his collegiate career at the University of Virginia, but transferred to UC Irvine after a freshman year in which he made just three appearances. While in college, Falck played for Orange County SC U-23 in USL League Two.

Richmond Kickers
In January 2020, Falck signed a professional contract with the Richmond Kickers of USL League One. He made his league debut for the club on 25 July 2020 against the Greenville Triumph. After appearing in all 16 league matches for the club during his rookie year, Falck re-signed with the club ahead of the 2021 season.

Central Valley Fuego FC
Falck signed with Central Valley Fuego FC in February 2022, ahead of their inaugural USL League One season. On 25 July 2022, Falck was named USL League One Player of the Week for Week 17 of the 2022 season, after scoring a brace and an assist against his old club, Richmond Kickers.

References

External links
Victor Falck at UC Irvine Athletics

1997 births
Living people
Virginia Beach City FC players
Orange County SC U-23 players
Richmond Kickers players
National Premier Soccer League players
USL League Two players
Swedish footballers
Association football midfielders
Swedish expatriate footballers
USL League One players
Swedish expatriate sportspeople in the United States
Expatriate soccer players in the United States
Virginia Cavaliers men's soccer players
UC Irvine Anteaters men's soccer players
Central Valley Fuego FC players
People from Härryda Municipality
Sportspeople from Västra Götaland County